United Soccer Ambassador Football Club is a football club based in Gardnersville, Liberia.

Achievements 
Liberian Premier League: 0
Liberian Cup: 0
Liberian Super Cup: 0

External links

Football clubs in Liberia
Sport in Monrovia